Atlas power station or Atlas Enerji İskenderun power station is a 1200-megawatt coal-fired power station in Turkey in İskenderun in Hatay Province, which burns imported and local coal and receives capacity payments. Construction was financed by Garanti Bank, Akbank and Işbank. Its owner, Diller, is on the Global Coal Exit List.

It is estimated that closing the plant by 2030, instead of when its licence ends in 2057, would prevent over 5000 premature deaths.

References

External links 

 Atlas power station on Global Energy Monitor

Coal-fired power stations in Turkey